The Hani languages are a group of closely related but distinct languages of the Loloish (Yi) branch of the Tibeto-Burman linguistic group. They are also referred to as the Hanoid languages by Lama (2012) and as the Akoid languages by Bradley (2007).

Approximately 1.5 million people speak these languages, mainly in China, Laos, Burma (Myanmar), and Vietnam; more than 90% of the speakers of these languages live in China. Various ethnicities that use Hani languages are grouped into a single class recognized nationality named Hani after the largest subgroup. In China, the languages of this group—which include Hani proper, Akha, and Hao-Bai (Honi and Baihong)—are considered dialects. Western scholars, however, have traditionally classified them as separate languages.

Varieties
In China, Akha and other related languages are considered to be derivatives of Hani. They are not mutually intelligible, which means that speakers of one language do not necessarily understand speakers of the other language. In 2007, according to Ethnologue, there were almost 1.5 million speakers of all Hani varieties. Slightly more than half (760,000) of these speakers can speak Hani properly (considering age etc.).
Lama (2012) groups the principal varieties of the Hani languages identified by Bradley (2007) as follows: Yunnan locations and speaker populations are from Haniyu Jianzhi 哈尼语简志  according to information from 1986. 
Ha-Ya 哈雅 had 850,000 speakers in 1982. The representative dialect is Dazhai 大寨 and is spoken in Lüchun County.
Hani 哈尼 (orthography: "Haqniqdoq") has 520,000 speakers in south-central Yunnan, China and 12,500 speakers in Vietnam. In Yunnan is spoken in Honghe, Yuanyang, Lüchun, and Jinping counties. 
Akha 阿卡  Yani 雅尼 (orthography: "Aqkaqdoq") has 550,000 speakers: 250,000 in China, 220,000 in Burma, 35,000 in northern Thailand, and 35,000 in northern Laos. In Yunnan, China it is spoken in Sipsongpanna. Representative dialect is Gelanghe Township 格朗和哈尼族乡, Menghai County.
Muda 木达 has over 2,000 speakers in Nanlianshan township 南联山乡, Jinghong City, Yunnan, China (Xu 1991).
Hao-Bai 豪白: 210,000 speakers in Mojiang, Yuanjiang, and Pu'er counties. Representative dialect: Shuigui 水癸, Mojiang County.
Haoni 豪尼 a.k.a. Honi has 120,000 speakers.
Baihong 白宏 has 60,000 speakers.

David Bradley (2007) considers the Hani-Akha (Ha-Ya) and Haoni-Baihong (Hao-Bai) languages to be part of an Akoid subgroup.

In China, all of the Bi-Ka languages are considered to form a single Hani dialect cluster ( fangyan), and the speakers are officially classified as ethnic Hani  (Haniyu Jianzhi 哈尼语简志 1986). Recognized dialects include Biyue 碧约 (autonym: bi31jɔ31), Kaduo 卡多, and Enu 峨努. In Yunnan, China, they are spoken in Mojiang, Jiangcheng, Jingdong, and other counties, with a total of 370,000 speakers. The representative dialect is that of Caiyuan 菜园, Mojiang County.

Other Hani varieties include Luomian 罗缅, Guozuo 果作, Gehuo 格活, and Guohe 郭合 (Tang 2011).

Yunnan Provincial Gazetteer
The Yunnan Provincial Gazetteer (云南省志：少数民族语言文字志, p. 113) classifies the Hani languages as follows. Additional dialects and datapoints from Zhang (1998) and Tang (2011) are also included.

Ha-Ya 哈雅方言, 680,000 people
Hani 哈尼次方言
Dazhai, Lüchun County dialect 绿春大寨哈尼土语 (Dazhai is the standard Hani 哈尼 dialect; also includes the datapoint of Dashuigou 大水沟)
Angluo 昂倮 ("Hhaqloldoq"): Malizhai, Yuanyang County dialect 元阳麻栗寨哈尼土语 (also includes the datapoint of Guozong 果统)
Luobi 罗碧 ("Lolbiqdoq"): Dazhai, Jinping County 金平大寨; Adebo, Jinping County 金平阿得博
Malutang, Jinping County dialect 金平马鹿塘哈尼土语 (also known as Loumei 楼梅)
Lami 腊咪 ("Laqmildoq"): Jiayin, Honghe County dialect 红河甲寅哈尼土语 (also includes the datapoint of Leyu 乐育)
Langza, Honghe County dialect 红河浪杂哈尼土语 (includes Yiche)
Luomian 罗缅: Xinyayong 新亚拥, Shangxincheng Township 上新城乡, Yuanyang County
Guozuo 果作: Pujiao 普角, Jinshuihe Town 金水河镇, Jinping County
Gehuo 格活: Baima Shangzhai 白马上寨村, Yingpan Township 营盘乡, Jinping County 金平县
Guohe 郭合: Dengqu Village 登去村, Majie Township 马街乡, Yuanjiang County 元阳县
Yani 雅尼次方言
Gelanghe, Xishuangbanna dialect 西双版纳格朗和雅尼土语
Naduo, Lancang County dialect 澜沧那多雅尼土语
Haoni (Hao-Bai) 豪白方言, 180,000 people
Haoni 豪尼: Shuigui, Mojiang County dialect 墨江水癸土语
Baihong 白宏: Bali, Mojiang County dialect 墨江坝利土语
Asuo 阿梭
Duota 多塔
Budu 布都
Bi-Ka 碧卡方言, 300,000 people
Biyue 碧约: Caiyuan Township, Mojiang County dialect 墨江菜园乡土语
Kaduo 卡多: Minxing Township, Mojiang County dialect 墨江民兴乡土语
Enu 哦怒: Dazhai, Yayi Township, Mojiang County dialect 墨江雅邑大寨土语

Distribution

China
In China, Hani languages are spoken mostly in areas east of the Mekong River in the south-central Yunnan province, concentrated in the Pu'er and Honghe prefectures as well as in parts of other surrounding prefectures. Hani is also spoken in Lai Châu Province of northwestern Vietnam, northern Laos, and Shan State of northeastern Burma.

Vietnam
Edmondson (2002) reports that the Hani of Vietnam is distributed in 2 provinces of northwestern Vietnam. The earliest Hani pioneers to Vietnam probably numbered around 5 to 6 families, and arrived in Mường Tè District from Jinping County and Lüchun County in Yunnan about 325 years ago. The Hani of Phong Thổ District and Bát Xát District arrived later, about 175 years ago from Yunnan. The Hani of Vietnam claim to be able to communicate in the Hani language with ethnic Hani from different areas of Vietnam despite significant geographical barriers. Edmondson (2002), however, reported different Hani speech varieties in various parts of northwestern Vietnam, which differ mostly lexically.

Mường Tè District, Lai Châu Province
Sín Thấu
Chung Chải
Mù Cả (Bản Mù Cả, etc.; Hà Nhì Cồ Chồ clan)
Ca Lăng
Thu Lũm
Xạ Hua Bun (Bản Chang Chau Pa, etc.; Hà Nhì La Mí clan)
Phong Thổ District, Lai Châu Province (Hà Nhì Đen or Black Hani people)
Bát Xát District, Lai Châu Province (Hà Nhì Đen or Black Hani people)
Y Tí
A Lù

Further reading
Tang Mingsheng (2011, ed.) contains word lists and ethnographies of Hani subgroups. There are 12 books in the Regional Culture Investigation of International Hani/Aka (国际哈尼/阿卡区域文化调查) series edited by Tang.
Tang Mingsheng 唐明生. 2011. 国际哈尼/阿卡区域文化调查: 中国元阳县马街哈尼族郭合人文化实录. Kunming: Yunnan People's Press 云南人民出版社.  (Guohe 郭合 people of Dengqu Village, Majie Township, Yuanjiang County 元阳县马街乡登去村)
Tang Mingsheng 唐明生. 2011. 国际哈尼/阿卡区域文化调查: 中国金平县哈尼田哈尼族罗比·罗们人文化实录. Kunming: Yunnan People's Press 云南人民出版社.  (Nuobi 罗比 and Nuomei 罗们 people of Hanitian 哈尼田, Jinhe Town 金河镇, Jinping County)
Tang Mingsheng 唐明生. 2011. 国际哈尼/阿卡区域文化调查: 中国金平县普角哈尼族果作人文化实录. Kunming: Yunnan People's Press 云南人民出版社.  (Guozuo 果作 people of Pujiao 普角, Jinshuihe Town 金水河镇, Jinping County)
Tang Mingsheng 唐明生. 2011. 国际哈尼/阿卡区域文化调查: 中国勐海县格朗和哈尼族阿卡人文化实录. Kunming: Yunnan People's Press 云南人民出版社.  (Akha 阿卡 people of Suhu Dazhai, Suhu Village, Gelanghe Township, Menghai County 勐海县格朗和乡苏湖村民委员会苏湖大寨自然村)
Tang Mingsheng 唐明生. 2011. 国际哈尼/阿卡区域文化调查: 中国新平县平掌哈尼族卡多人文化实录. Kunming: Yunnan People's Press 云南人民出版社.   (Kaduo people of Laomiaozhai 老缪寨, Pingzhang Township 平掌乡, Xinping County)
Tang Mingsheng 唐明生. 2011. 国际哈尼/阿卡区域文化调查: 中国金平县营盘哈尼族格活人文化实录. Kunming: Yunnan People's Press 云南人民出版社.  (Gehuo 格活 people of Baima Shangzhai, Yingpan Township, Jinping County 金平县营盘乡白马上寨村)
Tang Mingsheng 唐明生. 2011. 国际哈尼/阿卡区域文化调查: 中国金平县者米哈尼族哈备人文化实录. Kunming: Yunnan People's Press 云南人民出版社.  (Habei 哈备 people of Habei 哈备, Zhemi Township 者米乡, Jinping County)
Tang Mingsheng 唐明生. 2011. 国际哈尼/阿卡区域文化调查: 中国绿春县哈德哈尼族腊米人文化实录. Kunming: Yunnan People's Press 云南人民出版社.  (Lami 腊米 people of Hade 哈德, Sanmeng Township 三猛乡, Lüchun County)
Tang Mingsheng 唐明生. 2011. 国际哈尼/阿卡区域文化调查:  中国元阳县上新城哈尼族罗缅人文化实录. Kunming: Yunnan People's Press 云南人民出版社.  (Luomian 罗缅 people of Xinyayong 新亚拥, Shangxincheng Township 上新城乡, Yuanyang County)
Tang Mingsheng 唐明生. 2011. 国际哈尼/阿卡区域文化调查: 中国红河县洛恩哈尼族哈尼人文化实录. Kunming: Yunnan People's Press 云南人民出版社.  (Hani 哈尼 people of Luoen Township 洛恩乡, Honghe County)
Tang Mingsheng 唐明生. 2011. 国际哈尼/阿卡区域文化调查: 中国元阳县大坪哈尼族阿邬人文化实录. Kunming: Yunnan People's Press 云南人民出版社.  (Awu 阿邬 people of Xiaopingzi 小坪子, Daping Township 大坪乡, Yuanyang County)
Tang Mingsheng 唐明生. 2011. 国际哈尼/阿卡区域文化调查: 中国元阳县新街哈尼族昂倮人文化实录. Kunming: Yunnan People's Press 云南人民出版社.  (Angluo 昂倮 people of Xinjie Town 新街镇, Yuanyang County)

References

Bradley, David. 2007. East and Southeast Asia. In Moseley, Christopher (ed.), Encyclopedia of the World's Endangered Languages, 349-424. London & New York: Routledge.
Edmondson, Jerold A. 2002. "The Central and Southern Loloish Languages of Vietnam". Proceedings of the Twenty-Eighth Annual Meeting of the Berkeley Linguistics Society: Special Session on Tibeto-Burman and Southeast Asian Linguistics (2002), pp. 1–13.
Lama, Ziwo Qiu-Fuyuan. 2012. Subgrouping of Nisoic (Yi) Languages. Ph.D. thesis, University of Texas at Arlington.

External links
 Hani language recordings at GlobalRecordings.net
 Hani–Japanese wordlist with comparison with related languages (in Japanese)
 首本乡土文化读本《墨江哈尼族文化常识读本》出版并投入使用

Southern Loloish languages
Languages of China
Languages of Laos
Languages of Vietnam